Nicolas "Nico" Colaluca (born May 23, 1986) is an American former professional soccer player who played as a midfielder.

Career

Youth and college
Born in Providence, Rhode Island, he attended La Salle Academy in Providence. Colaluca played college soccer at the University of Virginia, and in the USL Premier Development League with the Rhode Island Stingrays. In 2004, he was awarded NSCAA High School Player of The Year and also participated in the High School McDonald's All-American game that year. While at Virginia, he was named to the 2004 Freshman All-American Team, the 2004 ACC All-Tournament Team, and the 2004 ACC All-Freshman Team.

Professional
Colaluca was drafted in the first round (6th overall) of the 2007 MLS SuperDraft by the Colorado Rapids, and subsequently made 4 MLS appearances during his two seasons with the team. He was traded to New England Revolution in exchange for Rob Valentino on May 6, 2009.

During 2009 Colaluca also spent time on loan with Western Mass Pioneers in the USL Second Division.

It was announced on November 18, 2010 that Colaluca would graduate from the MLS Generation Adidas program at the end of the 2010 season.

On August 3, 2011, he signed with the Atlanta Silverbacks of the NASL.

International
Colaluca played with the youth teams of the United States, including the under-20 level.

References

1986 births
Living people
Sportspeople from Providence, Rhode Island
American soccer players
Colorado Rapids players
Rhode Island Stingrays players
New England Revolution players
Virginia Cavaliers men's soccer players
Western Mass Pioneers players
Atlanta Silverbacks players
La Salle Academy alumni
USL League Two players
Major League Soccer players
USL Second Division players
North American Soccer League players
United States men's under-20 international soccer players
Colorado Rapids draft picks
Soccer players from Rhode Island
Association football midfielders